The 2021 Dartmouth Big Green football team represented Dartmouth College in the 2021 NCAA Division I FCS football season as a member of the Ivy League. The team was led by 21st-year head coach Buddy Teevens and played its home games at Memorial Field. Dartmouth averaged 5,480 fans per game.

Schedule

References

Dartmouth
Dartmouth Big Green football seasons
Ivy League football champion seasons
Dartmouth Big Green football